This is a list of famous or notable people from the Dominican Republic. The list also includes individuals of Dominican ancestry who reside overseas.

Authors

 Julia Alvarez
 Arambilet
 Frank Báez
 Josefina Baez

 Fernando Cabrera
 Rei Berroa

 Manuel del Cabral
 Aída Cartagena Portalatín
 Roberto Cassá
 Raquel Cepeda
 Tulio Manuel Cestero
 Hilma Contreras
 Angie Cruz
 Junot Díaz
 Leonor de Ovando
 Judith Dupré
 Virginia Elena Ortea
 León Félix Batista
 Arturo Féliz-Camilo

 Fabio Fiallo
 Freddy Ginebra
 Cristino Gómez
 Chico Gonzalez
 Pedro Henríquez Ureña
 Federico Henríquez y Carvajal
 Angela Hernández Nuñez
 Juan Isidro Jiménez Grullón
 Rita Indiana
 Mariano Lebrón Saviñón
 Marcio Veloz Maggiolo 
 José Mármol
 Andrés L. Mateo
 Félix Evaristo Mejía
 Miguel D. Mena
 Jeannette Miller
 Leopoldo Minaya
 Pedro Mir
 Domingo Moreno Jimenes
 Mateo Morrison
 Trina de Moya
 Flérida de Nolasco
 José Núñez de Cáceres
 Martha Rivera-Garrido
 Arturo Rodríguez Fernández
 Mu-Kien Adriana Sang/
 Alfredo Fernández Simó
 Salomé Ureña
 Jael Uribe
 Bernardo Vega
 Julio Vega Batlle
 Alanna Lockward
 Abelardo Vicioso
 Delia Weber

Business

Marcos Bisonó – businessman
José Blanco – cigar industrialist
Ligia Bonetti – businesswoman
Manuel Díez Cabral – businessman
Juan Cohen – businessman
José Luis Corripio – businessman
The Franjul Family – business family
Bartolomé Gamundi – businessman and government official in Puerto Rico
Manuel Alejandro Grullón – businessman, president of Banco Popular
José León Asensio – businessman
Victor Miguel Pacheco Mendez – businessman
Victor Oscar Pacheco Mendez – businessman
Leo Perez Minaya – businessman
Celso Marranzini – economist
Porfirio Pina – music executive
Frank Rainieri – businessman, chairman and founder of Grupo Punta Cana

Fashion and beauty pageant personalities

 Mariasela Álvarez – Miss World 1982
Eva Arias – beauty queen and fashion model
Sully Bonnelly – fashion designer
Susie Castillo – Miss USA 2003
Ana Contreras – Miss World Beach beauty semifinalist
Claudia Cruz – Miss World 2004 first runner-up
Marianne Cruz – Miss Universe 2008 second runner-up
Yadira Cury – Miss International 2005 first runner-up
Ada de la Cruz – Miss Universe 2009 first runner-up
Magali Febles – owner of the Miss Dominican Republic pageant franchise
Kimberly Jiménez – Miss Universe 2020 fifth runner-up
Gilda Jovine – fashion model
Francisca Lachapel – Nuestra Belleza Latina 2015
Hernan Lander – fashion designer
 Dulcita Lieggi – beauty pageant contestant
Denny Méndez – Miss Italy 1997
Clarissa Molina – Nuestra Belleza Latina 2016 V.I.P winner, Miss Dominican Republic 2015
Ruth Ocumárez – former beauty queen
Oscar de la Renta – fashion designer
Amell Santana – Miss Earth 2005 first runner-up
Samantha Sepulveda – model and policewoman
Renata Soñé – Miss Universe 2005 second runner–up
Amelia Vega – Miss Universe 2003, actress and model

Motion picture and television personalities

A–M

Irvin Alberti – actor
Nancy Alvarez – psychologist, television talk show host
Tina Aumont – film actress; daughter of Maria Montez
Freddy Beras-Goico – television host, comedian
Julissa Bermudez – television personality
Jenny Blanco – TV presenter and actress
Nashla Bogaert – actress
Micky Bretón – director
Francis Capra – actor
Rafael Campos – actor
Sergio Carlo – actor
Aimee Carrero – actress
Terry Carter – actor
Hosea Chanchez – actor
Charytín – actress, singer, television host
José Guillermo Cortines – actor, musician
Jackie Cruz – actress
Tony Dandrades – TV presenter
Juan Delancer – film director
Yasmin Deliz – television personality/actress
Arisleyda Dilone – actress
Akari Endo – actress
Hony Estrella – actress
Iamdra Fermín – TV presenter
Juan Fernández – actor
Yubo Fernandez – actress
René Fortunato – film director
J. Teddy Garces – actor
Andrés García – actor
Laura García-Godoy – actress
Jason Genao – actor from On My Block (TV series)
Milagros Germán – actress
Rick Gonzalez – actor
Iván García Guerra – theater actor
María Alejandra Guzmán – TV presenter
Juliana Harkavy – actress (Dominican mother)
Oscar Haza – television journalist
Wilson Jermaine Heredia – actor
 Jharrel Jerome – actor
Arthur Lithgow – actor
John Lithgow - actor
Jorge Lendeborg Jr. – actor
Sarah Jorge León – actress
Yelitza Lora – actress
Bryan Lugo – actor
Hemky Madera – actor
Judy Marte – actress
Luisito Martí – comedian
Agliberto Meléndez – film director
Mirtha Michelle – actress
Maria Montez – actress
Margarita Mora – actress
Rafael Molina Morillo – journalist
Carlos de la Mota – actor
Patrícia Mota – actress

N–Z

Amaury Nolasco – actor
Miguel A. Núñez, Jr. – actor
Robmariel Olea – actress
Karen Olivo – Tony Award-winning actor
Alex Paez – American actor of Dominican descent
Manny Pérez – actor (films Party Monster and El Cantante)
Frank Perozo – actor, producer
Nuria Piera – television journalist
Esmeralda Pimentel – telenovela actress (Dominican father)
Jessica Pimentel – actress
Dascha Polanco – actress (Netflix original series Orange Is the New Black)
Rosario Prieto – actress and dancer
Rafael José – Puerto Rican television personality (Dominican father)
Dania Ramirez – actress (television series Heroes and Entourage)
Silvestre Rasuk – actor
Victor Rasuk – actor
Monica Raymund – actress
Judy Reyes – actress (television series Scrubs)
Birmania Ríos – television personality (television show Despierta America)
Diana-Maria Riva – actress
Carolina Rivas – actress
Alfonso Rodríguez – film director
Michelle Rodriguez – actress
Julio Sabala – actor, comedian
Roberto Salcedo, Jr. – comedian
Zoe Saldana – actress
Carlos Sánchez – comedian, actor
Nuryn Sanlley – comedian
Harmony Santana – actress
Merlin Santana – actor
Rafael Corporán de los Santos – TV host
Enrique Segoviano – producer, director
Sharlene Taulé – actress and singer
Rosanna Tavarez – singer, television personality
Shannon Tavarez – Broadway actress and singer; Dominican father
Samir Saba – journalist, TV presenter
Jessy Terrero – director
Leticia Tonos – director
Celines Toribio – actress/model
Emily Tosta – actress
Isaac Saviñón – actor
Julian Scott Urena – actor
Vielka Valenzuela – talk show host
Michelle Vargas – actress, model
Denise Vasi – actress
Jamila Velazquez – actress
James Victor – actor
Juan Vidal – actor
Ludo Vika – actress, comedian
Tristan Wilds – actor
Carmen Wong Ulrich – journalist
Sandra Zaiter – actress and television host

Painters and artists

Oscar Abreu
Cándido Bidó
Monina Cámpora – artist
Tito Canepa
Jaime Colson
José García Cordero
Luis Desangles
Iliana Emilia Garcia
Diego José Hilaris – painter
Henri-Joseph de Forestier – painter
Paul Giudicelli
Aurelio Grisanty
Gilberto Hernández Ortega
Clara Ledesma
Tania Marmolejo
Yoryi Morel

Elsa Núñez
Raquel Paiewonsky
Olivia Peguero
Rigo Peralta
Guillo Pérez
Eligio Pichardo
Kenny Rivero
Abelardo Rodríguez Urdaneta
Amaya Salazar
Jorge Noceda Sanchez
Julia Santos Solomon
Darío Suro
Rosa Tavarez
Francisco Velásquez
Miguel Vila Luna
Celeste Woss y Gil

Political and military figures

Rafael Alburquerque – former vice president
Geovanny Vicente – political strategist and CNN columnist
Pedro Franco Badía – former Secretary of the Interior and Police
Buenaventura Báez Méndez – former president
Joaquín Balaguer Ricardo – former president (1960–1962, 1966–1978, 1986–1996)
Ramón Emeterio Betances – founder of Puerto Rican independence movement (Dominican father)
Salvador Jorge Blanco – former president (1982–1986)
Tomás Bobadilla – first ruler of the Dominican Republic
Juan Bosch y Gaviño – former president
Francisco Domínguez Brito – lawyer, politician
Francisco Alberto Caamaño Deñó – former president
Fernando Cabrera – New York City Councilman
Ramón Cáceres – former president
Margarita Cedeño de Fernández – vice-president and former First Lady of the Dominican Republic
David Collado – former mayor of Santo Domingo
Luis Colón, 1st Duke of Veragua – nobleman, grandson of Christopher Columbus
Lorraine Cortés-Vázquez – 65th Secretary of State of New York
Juan Pablo Duarte – one of the founding fathers of the Dominican Republic
Adriano Espaillat – New York State Assemblyman; first Dominican American to be elected to a State House in the United States
Rafael Espinal – New York State Assemblyman
Rafael Estrella Ureña – former president
Carlos Felipe Morales – former president
Ruy Fernández de Fuenmayor – Colonial governor of Venezuela
Leonel Fernández Reyna – former president (1996–2000, 2004–2008, 2008–2012)
Pedro Florentino – hero of the Battle of Jacuba, during the War of Independence from Haiti
Maximiliano Gómez – revolutionary political leader
Máximo Gómez – military commander of the Cuban War of Independence
Petronila Angélica Gómez – feminist
Antonio Guzmán Fernández – former president
Ulises Heureaux – former president
Antonio Imbert Barrera – former president
Gregorio Luperón – former president
Miguel Martinez – former New York City Councilman
Danilo Medina – former president (2012–2016)
Lucia Medina – accountant and politician
Hipólito Mejía – former president
Ramón Matías Mella – one of the founding fathers of the Dominican Republic
Fernando Arturo de Meriño – politician, theologian
The Mirabal sisters – political dissidents
Adolfo Alejandro Nouel – Santo Domingo archbishop and interim president
José Nuñez-Melo – Canadian politician
José Francisco Peña Gómez – mayor of Santo Domingo (1982–1986)
Joseline Peña-Melnyk – member of the Maryland General Assembly
Cesar A. Perales – 67th Secretary of State of New York

Thomas Perez – civil rights lawyer
Donald Reid Cabral – former president
Ydanis Rodríguez – New York City councilman
José Antonio (Pepillo) Salcedo – first president after the Restoration of the Dominican Republic
Roberto Salcedo, Sr. – mayor of Santo Domingo (2002–2016)
Juan Sánchez Ramírez – military general
Jean Alain Rodríguez Sánchez – lawyer
Francisco del Rosario Sánchez – one of the founding fathers of the Dominican Republic
Pedro Santana Familias – first president (1844)
José Del Castillo Saviñón – politician
Sergia Elena de Séliman – politician
Angel Taveras – mayor of Providence, Rhode Island
Carlos Morales Troncoso – former vice president, diplomat
Rafael Leónidas Trujillo – dictator (1930–1961)
Ramfis Trujillo – general and son of dictator Rafael Leónidas Trujillo
Francisco Urena – Massachusetts government official
Fernando Valerio – hero of the battles of Santiago (1844) and Sabana Larga (1856), during the War of Independence from Haiti
Elias Wessin y Wessin – former general

For a complete list, please refer to List of presidents of the Dominican Republic

Scientists and scholars

Soraya Aracena – anthropologist
Idelisa Bonnelly – marine biologist
Víctor A. Carreño – NASA aerospace engineer
Marcos Espinal – epidemiologist
Luis Arístides Fiallo Cabral – astronomer
Geovanny Vicente – political scientist, CNN columnist and Columbia University professor. 
Pedro Francisco Bonó – sociologist
Zoilo H. Garcia – aviator, engineer
Juan Isidro Jiménez Grullón – historian
Jorge Abraham Hazoury – biologist
Erich E. Kunhardt – physicist
Jose Gabriel Garcia – historian
Jorge Giordani – engineer, economist
Miguel Canela Lázaro – anatomist
Kathleen Martínez – archeologist
Frank Moya Pons – historian
Andrés Navarro – architect
Feniosky Peña-Mora – engineer
Margot Taule – architect
Juan Manuel Taveras Rodríguez – radiologist
Héctor Valdez Albizu – economist
Aída Mencía Ripley – academic

Singers and musicians

A–M
El Lapiz
Vakero
Toxic Crow
La Insuperable

Héctor Acosta – bachata/merengue singer
Cyrille Aimée – jazz musician (Dominican mother)
Manny Albam – jazz musician
Luis Alberti – merengue musician
José Alberto "El Canario" – salsa singer
Cardi B- rapper
El Alfa – rapper
Juan Bautista Alfonseca – military officer, composer
Anaís – pop singer
Andy Andy – singer
Arcángel – reggaeton artist
Aventura – bachata group
AZ – rapper
José Peña Suazo – Merengue singer
Sexappeal – salsa singer
Lope Balaguer – singer
Kirko Bangz – rapper
Ivan Barias – music producer
Eduardo Brito – baritone singer
Ninón Lapeiretta de Brouwer – female composer
Alex Bueno – merengue/bachata singer
Nini Caffaro – singer
José Manuel Calderón – bachata musician
Michel Camilo – jazz pianist
Angela Carrasco – singer
Israel Casado – merengue instrumentalist
Aisha Syed Castro – violinist
Bonny Cepeda – merengue singer
Las Chicas del Can
Javier Colon – singer and winner of the first season of U.S. reality series The Voice
Charles Connor – rhythm and blues drummer
Coro – freestyle singer/actor
Cristal Marie – Latin pop singer-songwriter
Damirón – pianist and composer
Casandra Damirón – folk singer
Kat DeLuna – singer
Joe Blandino – singer, songwriter
DJ Prostyle – hip hop DJ
Danielle Balbuena – rapper
DaniLeigh – singer
Don Miguelo – reggaeton artist
Dave East – rap artist
El Alfa – dembow artist
El Cata – merengue musician
El Jeffrey – merengue singer
El Prodigio – accordionist
Jackeline Estevez – pop singer
Bienvenido Fabian – composer
Fabolous – rapper
Zacarías Ferreira – bachata singer
Xiomara Fortuna – singer
Omar Franco – singer/composer
Billo Frómeta – singer
Juan Francisco García – merengue composer
Vicente García – singer-songwriter
Teodora Ginés – composer
Lilly Goodman – singer
Irv Gotti – producer
Leslie Grace – singer-songwriter
Juan Luis Guerra – merengue/bachata/salsa musician
Luichy Guzman – film composer
Ivonne Haza – soprano singer
Tatico Henriquez – merengue musician
Martha Heredia – singer
Julio Alberto Hernández – composer
Maridalia Hernández
Vinylz Hernandez – music producer
Eddy Herrera – merengue singer
Nicky Jam – reggaeton artist
Porfi Jimenez – trumpeter, composer and conductor
Ozuna – reggaeton artist
Alih Jey – singer
Krisspy – merengue singer
Bullumba Landestoy – pianist, composer
Ñico Lora – known as the "Father of Merengue" music, singer
Margarita Luna de Espaillat – composer
Anthony Ríos – ballad singer
Los Hermanos Rosario – merengue group
Luny Tunes – reggaeton producers/artists
Maffio – music producer
Domenic Marte – bachata singer
Melanie Martinez – pop singer (Dominican parents) 
La Materialista – singer
Henry Mendez – reggaeton artist
Miguelito – rapper (Dominican father)
José Antonio Molina – classical composer
Munchi – DJ

N–Z

Natti Natasha – singer
Noztra – reggaeton artist
Francisco Núñez – musical conductor
Pavel Nuñez – pop/rock musician
Omega – merenhouse musician
Juan Francisco Ordóñez – guitarist/composer
Ramón Orlando – merengue singer
Shalim Ortiz – singer
Johnny Pacheco – salsa singer/producer/bandleader
Leonardo Paniagua – bachata artist
Karina Pasian – singer/pianist
Chichí Peralta – singer, bandleader, percussionist
Rubby Perez – singer
Carlos Piantini – conductor and musician
Nelson Poket – rock singer-songwriter
Geovanny Polanco – merengue singer
Romeo Santos – bachata singer, very famous figure in the Dominican Republic
Prince Royce – bachata singer
Milly Quezada – singer, dubbed the "Queen of Merengue"
Fausto Rey – singer/composer
Frank Reyes – bachata singer
José Rufino Reyes y Siancas – composer of Dominican national anthem
Trio Reynoso – known as the "kings of merengue tipico" merengue/bachata group
Ariel Rivas – music producer
Mario Rivera – jazz composer/artist
Raulín Rodríguez – bachata singer
Richard Camacho – pop singer (Dominican Parents)
Tito Rodríguez – singer, bandleader
Rosangela – singer
Toño Rosario – merengue singer
Raulín Rosendo – salsa singer
Roger Sanchez – DJ/house music producer
Rolf Sanchez – pop musician (Dominican mother)
Daniel Santacruz – singer-songwriter
Lizette Santana (also known as Lizé) – singer-songwriter
Santaye – singer-songwriter
Antony Santos – bachata singer
Yoskar Sarante – bachata singer
Luis Segura – singer
Triple Seis – rapper
Twin Shadow – indie musician
Vicky Shell – singer-songwriter
Rafael Solano – songwriter/composer
Giselle Tavera – singer
Michael Tavera – composer
Ines Thomas Almeida – opera singer
Tokischa – rapper 
Cuco Valoy – merengue singer/bandleader
Luis Vargas – bachata singer
Sergio Vargas – merengue singer
Wilfrido Vargas – merengue singer
Johnny Ventura – merengue singer, vice mayor (1994–1998) and mayor of Santo Domingo (1998–2002)
Fernando Villalona – singer
J.R. Writer – rapper
Marcos Yaroide – Christian singer, composer

Sports figures

Baseball

 Manny Acta – former manager of the Cleveland Indians
 Willy Adames – professional baseball player
 Antonio Alfonseca – professional baseball player
 Carlos Almanzar – professional baseball player
 Felipe Alou – professional baseball manager and player
 Jesús Alou – professional baseball player
 Matty Alou – professional baseball player
 Moisés Alou – professional baseball player
 Joaquín Andújar – professional baseball player
 Greg Aquino – professional baseball player
 Joaquin Arias – professional baseball player
 Miguel Batista – professional baseball player
 Tony Batista – professional baseball player
 Danny Bautista – professional baseball player
 Denny Bautista – professional baseball player
 José Bautista – professional baseball player
 José Bautista (pitcher) – professional baseball player (pitcher)
 George Bell – professional baseball player
 Ronnie Belliard – professional baseball player
 Francis Beltrán – professional baseball player
 Adrián Beltré – professional baseball player
 Esteban Beltré – professional baseball player
 Armando Benítez – professional baseball player
 Joaquín Benoit – professional baseball player
 Ángel Berroa – professional baseball player
 Wilson Betemit – professional baseball player
 Tony Blanco – professional baseball player
 Pedro Borbón, Jr. – professional baseball player
 Yhency Brazobán – professional baseball player
 Juan Brito – professional baseball player
 Daniel Cabrera – professional baseball player
 Francisco Cabrera – professional baseball player
 Melky Cabrera – professional baseball player
 Robinson Canó – professional baseball player
 Rico Carty – professional baseball player
 Bernie Castro – professional baseball player
 Fabio Castro – professional baseball player
 Starlin Castro – professional baseball player
 Alberto Castillo – professional baseball player
 Luis Castillo – professional baseball player
 César Cedeño – professional baseball player
 Jesús Colomé – professional baseball player
 Bartolo Colón – professional baseball player
 Román Colón – professional baseball player
 Francisco Cordero – professional baseball player
 Deivi Cruz – professional baseball player
 Johnny Cueto – professional baseball player
 Seranthony Domínguez – professional baseball pitcher
 Octavio Dotel – professional baseball player
 Edwin Encarnación – professional baseball player
 Juan Encarnación – professional baseball player
 Pedro Feliz – professional baseball player
 Bartolomé Fortunato – professional baseball player
 Rafael Furcal – professional baseball player
 Julio Franco – professional baseball player
 Jerry Gil – professional baseball player
 Carlos Gómez – professional baseball player
 Deivy Grullón – professional baseball player

 Vladimir Guerrero – professional baseball player
 Vladimir Guerrero Jr. – professional baseball player 
 José Guillén – professional baseball player
 Cristian Guzmán – professional baseball player
 Freddy Guzmán – professional baseball player
 Ronald Guzman – professional baseball player
 Félix Heredia – professional baseball player
 Roberto Hernández (formerly known as Fausto Carmona) – professional baseball player
 Runelvys Hernández – professional baseball player
 Julián Javier – professional baseball player
 Stan Javier – professional baseball player
 José Lima – professional baseball player
 Francisco Liriano – professional baseball player
 Pedro Liriano – professional baseball player
 Mendy López – professional baseball player
 Julio Lugo – professional baseball player
 Ruddy Lugo – professional baseball player
 Héctor Luna – professional baseball player

 Manny Machado – professional baseball player
 Henry Mateo – professional baseball player
 Julio Mateo – professional baseball player
 Juan Marichal – professional baseball player
 Dámaso Marte – professional baseball player
 Pedro Martínez – Cy Young Award-winning professional baseball player
 Yermín Mercedes – catcher/designated hitter for the San Francisco Giants
 José Mesa – professional baseball player
 Omar Minaya – General Manager of the New York Mets
 Raúl Mondesí – professional baseball player
 Agustín Montero – professional baseball player
 Juan Morillo – professional baseball player
 Abraham Núñez – professional baseball player
 Leo Núñez – professional baseball player
 José Offerman – professional baseball player
 Miguel Olivo – professional baseball player
 David Ortiz – professional baseball player
 Ramón Ortiz – professional baseball player
 Pablo Ozuna – professional baseball player
 Ronny Paulino – professional baseball player
 Carlos Peña – professional baseball player
 Tony Peña – professional baseball player
 Wily Mo Peña – professional baseball player
 Jhonny Peralta – professional baseball player
 Antonio Pérez – professional baseball player
 Mélido Pérez – professional baseball player
 Neifi Pérez – professional baseball player
 Odalis Pérez – professional baseball player
 Rafael Pérez – professional baseball player
 Timo Pérez – professional baseball player
 Hipólito Pichardo – professional baseball player
 Plácido Polanco – professional baseball player

 Albert Pujols – first baseman and designated hitter for the St. Louis Cardinals and Los Angeles Angels
 Aramis Ramírez – professional baseball player
 Hanley Ramírez – professional baseball player
 Manny Ramírez – professional baseball player
 José Reyes – professional baseball player
 Fernando Rodney – professional baseball player
 Alex Rodriguez – professional baseball player
 Félix Rodríguez – professional baseball player
 Henry Rodríguez – professional baseball player
 Julio Rodríguez (born 2000) La Insuperable professional baseball outfielder
 Wandy Rodríguez – professional baseball player
 Duaner Sánchez – professional baseball player
 Carlos Santana − first baseman and catcher for the Cleveland Indians and Philadelphia Phillies
 Víctor Santos – professional baseball player
 Jean Segura – professional baseball player
 Alfonso Soriano – professional baseball player
 Jorge Sosa – professional baseball player
 Sammy Sosa – professional baseball player
 Julián Tavárez – professional baseball player
 Oscar Taveras – professional baseball player
 Willy Taveras – professional baseball player
 Miguel Tejada – professional baseball player
 Rubén Tejada – professional baseball player
 Robinson Tejeda – professional baseball player
 Luis Terrero – professional baseball player
 Salomón Torres – professional baseball player
 Juan Uribe – professional baseball player
 Wilson Valdez – professional baseball player
 José Valverde – professional baseball player
 Claudio Vargas – professional baseball player
 Tetelo Vargas – professional baseball player
 Yordano Ventura – professional baseball player
 Ozzie Virgil – professional baseball player
 Luis Vizcaíno – professional baseball player
 Edinson Vólquez – professional baseball player
 Héctor Wagner – professional baseball player

Basketball

 Orlando Antigua – professional basketball player
 Trevor Ariza – professional basketball player
 Amaury Filion – professional basketball player
 Luis Flores – basketball player, 2009 top scorer in the Israel Basketball Premier League
 Francisco García – professional basketball player
 Al Horford – professional basketball player
 Tito Horford – professional basketball player
 Felipe López – professional basketball player
 Jack Michael Martínez – professional basketball player
 Sammy Mejia – professional basketball player
 Rigoberto Mendoza (born 1992) – basketball player for Maccabi Haifa of the Israeli Basketball Premier League
 Alesi Mingo – basketball player
 Luis Montero – basketball player
 Carlos Morban – basketball player
 Jaime Peterson – basketball player
 Miguel Angel Pichardo – basketball player
 Orlando Sánchez – professional basketball player
 Ron Sanchez – professional basketball player
 Edward Santana – professional basketball player
 Edgar Sosa – professional basketball player
 Gerardo Suero – professional basketball player
 Karl-Anthony Towns – professional basketball player
 Eloy Vargas – professional basketball player
 José Vargas (basketball) – professional basketball player
 Charlie Villanueva – professional basketball player
 Franklin Western – professional basketball player

Boxing
 Francisco Contreras – boxer
 Carlos Cruz – former professional boxing champion
 Leo Cruz – professional boxing champion 
 Manuel Félix Díaz – professional boxer
 Javier Fortuna – professional boxer
 Julio Gervacio – professional boxer
 Fernando Guerrero – professional boxer
 Joan Guzmán – professional boxer
 Luis Ernesto José – professional boxer
 Eleoncio Mercedes – professional boxer
 Juan Carlos Payano – boxer
 Delvin Rodriguez – professional boxer
 Edwin Rodriguez – professional boxer
 Glen Tapia – professional boxer

Other sports
 Raul Aguayo – national sail team member
Juana Arrendel – high jumper
 Milagros Cabral – professional volleyball player
 José Miguel Cáceres – professional volleyball player
 Brenda Castillo – professional volleyball player

 Luis Castillo – professional football player
 Fany Chalas – sprinter
 Stalin Colinet – former professional football player
 Yuderqui Contreras – weightlifter
 Domingo Cordero – hurdler
 Bethania de la Cruz – professional volleyball player
 Wendy Cruz – cyclist
 Marcos Díaz – ultra-distance swimmer
 Karla Echenique – professional volleyball player
 Edward Vinicio Espinal – professional soccer player
 Mariano Díaz Mejía – professional soccer player
 Jaime Espinal – Olympic wrestler
 Víctor Estrella Burgos – tennis player
 Lisvel Elisa Eve – professional volleyball player
 Mary Joe Fernández – professional tennis player
 Alex Garcia – UFC fighter

 Iván Ernesto Gómez – elite mountaineer
 Aumi Guerra – professional bowler
 Dionicio Gustavo – karateka
 Robinson Hilario – kitesurfer
 José Hernández – tennis player
 Francia Jackson – professional volleyball player
 Jhohanny Jean – taekwondo athlete
 Ernesto Jerez – sportscaster
 Julio Luciano – high jumper
 Víctor Martínez – professional bodybuilder
 Gabriel Mercedes – taekwondo practitioner
 Juan Núñez – sprinter
 Sidarka Núñez – professional volleyball player
 Victor Nunez – soccer player
 Michael-Ray Pallares-González – tennis player
 Pablo Ramírez – professional skateboarder
 Alexis Panisse – runner
 Domingo Peralta – soccer player
 Wanda Rijo – weightlifter
 Heidy Rodríguez – karateka
 Jeoselyna Rodríguez Santos – professional volleyball player
 Cindy Rondón – professional volleyball player
 Dante Rosario – professional football player
 Félix Sánchez – Olympic gold medal–winning hurdler
 Raysa Sanchez – sprinter
 Luguelín Santos – Olympic silver medalist-sprinter
 Annerys Vargas – professional volleyball player
 Jack Veneno – professional wrestler
 Ana Villanueva – karateka

Other personalities

Rolando Acosta – associate justice
Félix Acosta-Núñez – journalist
Danny Almonte – notable Little League player
Radhames Aracena – music producer
Rafael Bello – journalist
Billy Berroa – sports broadcaster
Pedro Borrell – architect
José María Cabral – director
Vladimir Caamaño – comedian
Rafael Calventi – architect, diplomat
Silvia Carreño-Coll – district judge
Claudia Castaños – journalist
Cirilo J Guzmán – lawyer
Marino Vinicio Castillo – lawyer
Miguel Cocco – politician
Shirley Collado – psychology professor, president of Ithaca college
Federico Alberto Cuello Camilo – diplomat
Alexandra Cheron – socialite/model
Jose DeCamps – dancer
Dayanny De La Cruz – chef
Nelson de la Rosa – actor, comedian
Mario Alvarez Dugan – journalist
Rudy Duthil – advertising executive

Jose Gutierez – dancer, choreographer
José María Heredia y Heredia – poet (Dominican parents)
Emilio Prud’Homme – writer and lawyer
Carmen Imbert Brugal – jurist, author
María Isabel Soldevila – journalist
Michele Jimenez – ballet dancer 
Mercedes Laura Aguiar – educator
Paul Luna – restaurateur
Johnny Marines – music executive
Rámon Marrero Aristy – journalist
Maria Marte – prominent chef working in Spain
Jose E. Martinez – lawyer
Ralph Mercado – founder of RMM Records; music producer
Charles E Milander – social media expert
Rafael Molina Morillo – journalist
Francisco Moncion – ballet dancer, choreographer
 Miguel Núñez – theologian
Providencia Paredes – assistant and confidante to Jacqueline Kennedy Onassis
Quirino Paulino – notorious drug smuggler
Arturo Pellerano Alfau – journalist
Ilka Tanya Payán – actress, AIDS/HIV activist
Pedro Saúl Pérez – activist
Oscar Peter – champion figure skater
Domingo Pilarte – evangelist
Santiago Luis Polanco Rodríguez – drug dealer
Carlos Rubio – political analyst
Porfirio Rubirosa – diplomat, polo player, race car driver
Socorro Sánchez del Rosario –  educator, journalist
José Santana (economist) – economist
Manuel Tarrazo – fashion designer
Miguel Vila Luna – architect and painter

See also
People of the Dominican Republic
Dominican American
List of Dominican Americans
Culture of the Dominican Republic

References